Herolds Bay is a settlement in Garden Route District Municipality in the Western Cape province of South Africa.

Holiday resort west of Malgas River mouth, some 24km south-west of George and east of Guano Bay. Named after the first Dutch Reformed minister of George, Tobias Johannes Herold (1812-1823).

References

Populated places in the George Local Municipality